was a town located in Mima District, Tokushima Prefecture, Japan.

As of 2003, the town had an estimated population of 5,718 and a density of 125.95 persons per km2. The total area was 45.40 km2.

On March 1, 2005, Sadamitsu, along with the town of Handa, and the village of Ichiu (all from Mima District), was merged to create the town of Tsurugi.

External links
 Tsurugi official website (in Japanese)

Dissolved municipalities of Tokushima Prefecture
Tsurugi, Tokushima